David Jäschke (born 17 July 1978) is a German former competitive figure skater. He won the bronze medal at the 1995 European Youth Olympic Festival in Andorra and reached the free skate at two World Junior Championships, finishing 11th in 1996 (Brisbane, Australia) and 16th in 1998 (Saint John, New Brunswick, Canada). Competing in the 1997–98 ISU Junior Series, he won two bronze medals and qualified for the Junior Series Final, where he finished 6th.

Programs

Competitive highlights 
GP: Grand Prix; JGP: Junior Series/Junior Grand Prix

References

External links 
 

1978 births
German male single skaters
Living people
Figure skaters from Berlin
20th-century German people
21st-century German people